Daniel Edward Dugdale (October 28, 1864 – March 9, 1934) was a Major League Baseball catcher. He played for the 1886 Kansas City Cowboys and 1894 Washington Senators in the National League. He continued to play ball in the minor leagues through 1897, primarily in the Western Association. He managed in the minors with the Peoria Distillers (player/manager) in 1896-97, Seattle Chinooks (1903), Portland Browns (1904), Seattle Siwashes (1907–08) and Seattle Giants (1911).

He became involved in Seattle's real estate market and became fairly wealthy. He used his wealth to build several baseball stadiums in the Seattle area. The main stadium in Seattle bore his name until it was destroyed in 1932.

Notes

Sources

Major League Baseball catchers
Kansas City Cowboys (NL) players
Washington Senators (1891–1899) players
Omaha Omahogs players
Keokuk Hawkeyes players
Denver Mountain Lions players
Denver Mountaineers players
Buffalo Bisons (minor league) players
Rochester Maroons players
Chicago Maroons players
Minneapolis Millers (baseball) players
Omaha Lambs players
St. Paul Saints (AA) players
Green Bay Bays players
Chattanooga Warriors players
Peoria Distillers players
Burlington Colts players
Peoria Blackbirds players
Kansas City Blues (baseball) players
Baseball players from Illinois
1864 births
1934 deaths
19th-century baseball players
Portland Beavers managers
Seattle Chinooks players